Ralph Allen (1693–1764) was an English entrepreneur and philanthropist, notable for his reforms to the UK postal system.

Ralph Allen may also refer to:

Ralph Allen (journalist) (1913–1966), Canadian journalist, editor, and novelist
Ralph G. Allen (1934–2004), American writer and scholar
Ralph Allen (painter, born 1926) (1926–2019), Canadian painter
Ralph Allen (painter, born 1952), Haitian painter
Ralph Shuttleworth Allen (1817–1887), British Conservative Member of Parliament 1868–1879 
Ralph Allen (footballer) (1906–1981), English professional footballer
Ralph O. Allen, professor of chemistry and environmental sciences

See also
Allen (surname)